The 2016–17 Campionato Sammarinese di Calcio season was the 32nd since its establishment. It is the only level in San Marino, in which all the country's 15 amateur football clubs play (there is no relegation). The season began on 9 September 2016 and ended with the play-off final on 20 May 2017. Tre Penne were the defending champions. The fixtures and group compositions were announced on 27 August 2016.

Participating teams

Because there is no promotion or relegation in the league, the same 15 teams who competed in the league last season competed in the league this season.
 S.P. Cailungo (Borgo Maggiore)
 S.S. Cosmos (Serravalle)
 F.C. Domagnano (Domagnano)
 S.C. Faetano (Faetano)
 F.C. Fiorentino (Fiorentino)
 S.S. Folgore Falciano Calcio (Serravalle)
 A.C. Juvenes/Dogana (Serravalle)
 S.P. La Fiorita (Montegiardino)
 A.C. Libertas (Borgo Maggiore)
 S.S. Murata (San Marino)
 S.S. Pennarossa (Chiesanuova)
 S.S. San Giovanni (Borgo Maggiore)
 S.P. Tre Fiori (Fiorentino)
 S.P. Tre Penne (Serravalle)
 S.S. Virtus (Acquaviva)

Regular season
The 15 clubs will be split into two groups; one with eight clubs and another with seven clubs.

Group A

Group B

Results
All teams played twice against the teams within their own group and once against the teams from the other group. This meant that the clubs in the eight-club group played 21 matches each while the clubs in the seven-club group played 20 matches each during the regular season.

Play-offs
The top three teams from each group advanced to a play-off which determined the season's champion and qualifiers for the 2017–18 UEFA Champions League and the 2017–18 UEFA Europa League.

The play-offs were played in a double-eliminination format with both group winners earning byes in the first and second round. All matches were decided over one leg with extra time and then penalties used to break ties.

The schedule was announced on 10 April 2017.

Bracket

First round

Second round

Virtus eliminated.

Third round

Juvenes/Dogana eliminated.

Fourth round

Libertas eliminated.

Semi-final

Folgore eliminated and qualified for 2017–18 Europa League first qualifying round

Final

La Fiorita qualified for 2017–18 Champions League first qualifying round and Tre Penne qualified for 2017–18 Europa League first qualifying round.

References

External links
 

Campionato Sammarinese di Calcio
San Marino
1